Albert Toft (3 June 1862 – 18 December 1949) was a British sculptor.

Toft's career was dominated by public commemorative commissions in bronze, mostly single statues of military or royal figures.  The Diamond Jubilee of Queen Victoria in 1897, Boer War to 1902, and then World War I to 1918, provided plentiful commissions.  The Oxford Dictionary of National Biography describes Toft as one of the major figures of the "New Sculpture" following on from William Hamo Thornycroft and George Frampton. Toft described his work as 'Idealist' but he also said of himself that "to become an idealist you must necessarily first be a realist."

His father was a notable modeller in ceramics, and his brother was the landscape artist Joseph Alfonso Toft.

Biography
Toft was born in Handsworth, then in Staffordshire, and now a suburb of Birmingham. His parents were Charles Toft (1832–1909) and Rosanna Reeves. His father was a senior modeller at Mintons, and then the chief modeller at Wedgwood pottery.  He had also taught modelling at Birmingham School of Art for some years to 1873.

Toft trained at Wedgwood, and attended art schools in Hanley, Staffordshire and Newcastle upon Tyne. In 1881 he won a scholarship to study sculpture at the South Kensington Schools under Professor Édouard Lantéri. He received silver medals in his second and third years.

From 1885 onwards Toft exhibited at the Royal Academy and some of his most notable works exhibited at the Royal Academy included Fate-Led (1890, now at Walker Art Gallery), The Sere and Yellow Leaf (1892), Spring (1897, now at Birmingham Museum and Art Gallery), The Spirit of Contemplation (1901; Laing Art Gallery, Newcastle) and The Metal Pourer (1915). In 1915 his sculpture The Bather was purchased using the Royal Academy's Chantrey Fund. His 1888 bust of William Ewart Gladstone for the National Liberal Club was modelled from life and acclaimed as one of the best. In 1900 Toft received a bronze medal at the Universal Exhibition in Paris.

He created monuments to Queen Victoria for Leamington Spa, Nottingham, and South Shields, and to Edward VII in Birmingham and Warwick. He designed the coronation medal of George V and Queen Mary (1911) and a statuette of W. S. Penley playing Charley's Aunt for Royal Doulton (1913). He also published a book, Modelling and Sculpture in 1911, which was reprinted in 1949.

He made a series of war memorials, starting with the South African War Memorial in Cardiff (1910), and then many after the First World War, including the Royal Fusiliers War Memorial in London (1922), and four statues for the Birmingham Hall of Memory (1923–24).

In 1891 Toft was elected to the Art Workers Guild and in 1938 he was elected a fellow to the Royal Society of British Sculptors.

He died in Worthing.

Public monuments and memorials

Other works

 Two figures for the Union Assurance war memorial
 Memorial to Charles Swinnerton Heap, unveiled 1901, relocated to Walsall Town Hall in 1905.
 Bronze study of the actress Ellaline Terriss, 1901, held in a private collection.
 Children of the Sculptor, 1904, this study by Toft of three of his children is held in a private collection.
 The Spirit of Contemplation, 1906, Laing Art Gallery, Newcastle upon Tyne.
 The Bather, 1915, Victoria and Albert Museum, London, on loan from the Tate Gallery.
 Tomb effigy in marble of Sir John Robinson, 1930, St Anne's Church, Worksop
 Maternity, held in a private collection, this work is said to show the influence of the Lantéri-Dalou tradition.
 Fate-led, Walker Art Gallery, Liverpool.

Gallery

References 

 Modelling And Sculpture by Albert Toft, Seeley, Service & Co. Limited London, 1949—A Full Account of the Various Methods and Processes Employed in These Arts

External links

Toft on The Victorian Web
National Archives file

1862 births
1949 deaths
19th-century English sculptors
19th-century English male artists
20th-century English sculptors
20th-century English male artists
English male sculptors
People from Handsworth, West Midlands
Sibling artists